Gerald Ray Holan (May 27, 1931 – July 23, 2022) was an American swimmer who represented the United States at the 1952 Summer Olympics in Helsinki, Finland.

Biography
Holan was 1949 National High School Champion in the 100-yard breaststroke, swimming for Proviso Township High School in Maywood, Illinois, and won the National YMCA 200-yard breaststroke championship that year. He started college at Iowa State but dropped out within two weeks and later attended The Ohio State University. Holan was an All-American for the Buckeyes in 1951, 1952, and 1953, helping them win the Big 10 300 yard medley relay all three years. In 1953 he won the Big 10 200 yd breaststroke and was NCAA Champion in the 200 yard butterfly, before that stroke used a dolphin kick. He also helped Ohio State win NCAA titles in the medley relay in 1951 and 1953.

He swam in the 1952 United States Olympic swim trials in the 200 meter breaststroke, finishing second behind Bowen Stassforth. At Helsinki, Holan set an Olympic record of 2:36.8 in his initial heat, beating Joe Verdeur's record of 2:39.3.  He failed to qualify in the semifinals for the Olympic final, however, by 0.2 seconds.  Subsequently, he finished first at the 1952 Outdoor AAU National Championships in the 110 yard breaststroke and second in the 220 yard breaststroke competing with Bowen Stassforth for the top spot in both events. Holan's second place clocking of 2:35 flat at the nationals (a distance 3 feet 9 inches longer than the Olympic final) in the 220 yd breaststroke (long course) would have put him in medal contention earlier in Helsinki.

After graduating from Ohio State with a business degree, Holan began work for Bell Telephone. He left for a tour of duty in the Korean War, as an artillery officer with the United States Army, but returned after the war to work for Bell for his entire business career. Holan was inducted into the Ohio State Hall of Fame.

Notes
Holan's time of 2:35 flat in the 220 yard breaststroke (long course) at the 1952 AAU Outdoor Nationals correlates to a time of 2:34 or faster in the 200 meter breaststroke (long course). This performance was the second fastest (pre bifurcation of the breaststroke in 1953) all-time for the 220 yard breaststroke (long course) and would have been the second fastest 200 meter breaststroke (long course) in history as well if it had been dual timed.  This is evidenced by the dual distance timed race in the 1950 National AAU Indoor Championships in the 220 yard breaststroke (short course) between Joe Verdeur and Robert Brawner. During the race, Verdeur broke the world record for 200 meters with a time of 2:28.3 (short course).  However, Brawner won the race with a time of 2:29.3 for the full 220 yards beating Verdeur who was second in 2:29.4.

References

See also
 List of Ohio State University people

External links
 

1931 births
2022 deaths
American male freestyle swimmers
Ohio State Buckeyes men's swimmers
Olympic swimmers of the United States
Sportspeople from Cook County, Illinois
Swimmers at the 1952 Summer Olympics
People from Westchester, Illinois
Military personnel from Illinois